HMS Conundrum was the unofficial name given to the large drums used for laying the World War II Normandy landings PLUTO pipeline. The drums were cone-ended, hence the abbreviation CONUN and were used in the sea, hence subsequent ship HMS Conundrum nickname. They were 30 feet in diameter and weighed 250 tons.

Views of "HMS Conundrum" components

References

Western European Campaign (1944–1945)
Oil pipelines in the United Kingdom
Coastal construction
Anglo-Persian Oil Company